William Wakefield Baum (November 21, 1926 – July 23, 2015) was an American prelate of the Roman Catholic Church. He served as bishop of the Diocese of Springfield-Cape Girardeau in Missouri (1970–1973) and archbishop of the Archdiocese of Washington D.C (1973–1980) before serving in the Roman Curia as prefect of the Congregation for Catholic Education (1980–1990) and major penitentiary (1990–2001).

Baum was elevated to the College of Cardinals in 1976. At the time of his 1980 appointment as prefect of the Congregation for Catholic Education, he was the highest-ranking American ever in the church. Baum was a cardinal longer than any other American.

Biography

Early life and education 
William  White was born in Dallas, Texas,  on November 21, 1926, to Harold E. and Mary Leona (née Hayes) White. His father, a Presbyterian, died when William was a young child, and he and his mother moved to Kansas City, Missouri. His mother married Jerome Charles Baum, a Jewish businessman, who adopted William and gave him his last name; Jerome Baum died when William was 12.

Baum received his early education at the parochial school of St. Peter's Parish in Kansas City, and began to serve as an altar boy at the church at age ten. He entered St. John's Minor Seminary in 1940, and then studied philosophy in the undergraduate program at Cardinal Glennon College in Shrewsbury, Missouri. In 1947, Baum entered Kenrick Seminary in St. Louis for his graduate theological studies.

Priesthood 
Baum was ordained to the priesthood by Archbishop Edwin V. O'Hara  for the Diocese of Kansas City-St. Joseph on May 12, 1951. After his ordination, Baum was assigned as assistant pastor of St. Aloysius Parish in Kansas City. He taught theology and church history at St. Theresa College in Kansas, City. from 1954 to 1956.  Baum also taught at St. Aloysius Academy and Glennon High School, both in Kansas City. The diocese then sent him to study in Rome at the Pontifical University of St. Thomas Aquinas, where he earned a Doctor of Sacred Theology degree in 1958. His thesis was entitled: "The Teaching of Cardinal Cajetan on the Sacrifice of the Mass".

Returning to Kansas City, Baum resumed his teaching duties at St. Theresa College (1958–63) and served as secretary of the Diocesan Tribunal. He also did pastoral work at St. Theresa's Parish and St. Peter's Parish, both in Kansas City. In 1960, Baum became pastor of St. Cyril's Parish in Sugar Creek, Missouri. He published "Considerations Toward the Theology of the Presbyterate" in 1961. He was named a papal chamberlain by Pope John XXIII in April 1961, and vice-chancellor of the diocese in 1962.

From 1962 to 1965, Baum served as a peritus, or theological expert, in Rome for Bishop Charles Helmsing at the Second Vatican Council. In that capacity, he worked with the Secretariat for Christian Unity and helped draft Unitatis Redintegratio, the Council's decree on ecumenism. In 1964, he was named the first executive director of the Committee on Ecumenical and Interreligious Affairs for the National Conference of Catholic Bishops, a post which he held for five years. He also served as a member of the Joint Working Group of representatives of the Catholic Church and World Council of Churches (1965–69) and of the Mixed Committee of representatives of the Catholic Church and the Lutheran World Federation (1965–66).

In 1967, Baum returned to Kansas City, where he served as chancellor of the diocese and pastor of St. James Church in Kansas City. He was named a domestic prelate in 1968.

Bishop of Springfield-Cape Girardeau 
On February 18, 1970, Baum was appointed as the third bishop of the Diocese of Springfield-Cape Girardeau by Pope Paul VI. He received his episcopal consecration on April 6, 1970, from Cardinal John Carberry, with Bishops Charles Helmsing and Joseph Sullivan serving as co-consecrators. He selected as his episcopal motto: "Ministry of Reconciliation" from 2 Corinthians 5:18.

Baum served as a delegate to the 1971 World Synod of Bishops at the Vatican, and was chairman of the Bishops' Committee for Ecumenical and Interreligious Affairs (1972–75).

Archbishop of Washington
On Mary 5, 1973, Pope Paul VI elevated Baum to archbishop of the Archdiocese of Washington, D.C..  He was installed on May 9, 1973.

In the 1976 consistory, Pope Paul VI named Baum as cardinal-priest of Santa Croce in Via Flaminia. He participated in the two conclaves of 1978 that elected Pope John Paul I and Pope John Paul II. On March 18, 1980, after his appointment to the Roman Curia, Baum resigned his position as archbishop of the Archdiocese of Washington, D.C.

Roman Curia 
Pope John Paul II appointed Baum in 1980 as prefect of the Congregation for Catholic Education, succeeding Cardinal Gabriel-Marie Garrone.  As prefect, Baum oversaw the church educational policy and structure.  He had jurisdiction over all the parochial schools, Catholic colleges and universities, Newman Centers, and seminaries worldwide

In 1990, Pope John Paul II named Baum as major penitentiary of the Apostolic Penitentiary, succeeding Cardinal Luigi Dadaglio. The  Apostolic Penitentiary is a church tribunal that regulates the granting of indulgences, the operation of the internal forum, and the forgiveness of sins in the Sacrament of Reconciliation.

Resignation 
Somewhat frail in his later years, Baum also suffered from deteriorating eyesight. His resignation as Penitentiary was accepted the day after his 75th birthday in 2001, but he remained active in Rome to the extent that his health permitted, and attended the meeting of American cardinals called to deal with the sex abuse scandal in 2003. He was the Ecclesiastical Sponsor of Bernard Cardinal Law, Disgraced Archbishop of Boston.

As a cardinal elector, Baum participated in the 2005 papal conclave that elected Pope Benedict XVI.  Baum was the senior cardinal priest to participate in that conclave. On March 8, 2011, Baum became the longest-serving American cardinal, surpassing the record established by Cardinal James Gibbons of Baltimore in 1921.

Baum died at the age of 88 on July 23, 2015 in a home in Washington, D.C., run by the Little Sisters of the Poor, where he had spent his last years. He was buried in the Cathedral of St. Matthew the Apostle in Washington, DC.

References

Clergy from Dallas
Roman Catholic Diocese of Kansas City–Saint Joseph
1926 births
2015 deaths
Pontifical University of Saint Thomas Aquinas alumni
21st-century American cardinals
Roman Catholic archbishops of Washington
20th-century American cardinals
Roman Catholic bishops of Springfield–Cape Girardeau
Members of the Congregation for Catholic Education
Major Penitentiaries of the Apostolic Penitentiary
Cardinals created by Pope Paul VI
American adoptees
Catholics from Texas